Jacob Gundersen (29 October 1875 – 21 January 1968) was a Norwegian-American who represented Norway in the 1908 Olympics. He was a  freestyle wrestler and Olympic medalist.

Gundersen was born in Fjære (later incorporated into Grimstad), in Aust-Agder county, Norway.   He received a silver medal in the heavyweight class at the 1908 Summer Olympics in London. The heavyweight class had eleven competitors, nine wrestlers from the UK, one from the US, and Gundersen from Norway. Gundersen defeated Walter West, Frederick Humphreys and Edward Nixson, but lost to Con O'Kelly in the final. Jacob Gundersen died  in Westchester, New York.

References

External links
 

1875 births
1968 deaths
People from Grimstad
Olympic wrestlers of Norway
Wrestlers at the 1908 Summer Olympics
Norwegian male sport wrestlers
Olympic silver medalists for Norway
Norwegian emigrants to the United States
Year of death unknown
Olympic medalists in wrestling
Medalists at the 1908 Summer Olympics
Sportspeople from Agder